Elephant walk or Elephant Walk might refer to:

 Elephant Walk, a 1954 film starring Elizabeth Taylor (after the 1948 novel)
 Elephant Walk (novel), a 1948 novel by "Robert Standish", Digby George Gerahty
 Elephant Walk (Texas A&M), a Texas A&M University tradition
 Elephant walk, a hazing tradition described in detail in the book Not Gay
 "Elephant Walk", a 2002 song by Har Mar Superstar
 Elephant walk (aviation), aircraft taxiing in close formation before takeoff
 "Baby Elephant Walk", a 1961 song by Henry Mancini